Hofgarten is German for "court garden" and refers to the gardens of a seat or Residenz of a noble family, usually a reigning prince or sovereign.

Important court gardens with this name are found in:

Ansbach
Augsburg
Bayreuth
Bonn
Coburg
Düsseldorf
Eichstätt
Innsbruck, see Hofgarten, Innsbruck
Kempten (Allgäu)
Landshut
Munich, see Hofgarten (Munich)
Veitshöchheim, see Veitshöchheim Castle
Weihenstephan, see Weihenstephan Abbey
Würzburg, see Würzburg Residenz

See also 
 Court (royal)
 Hof (disambiguation)